New Mexico State Road 2 (NM 2) is a state highway in the state of New Mexico. It travels southeast from U.S. Route 285 (US 285), outside of Roswell, New Mexico, passing through Midway. While in Dexter, it turns right as Old Dexter Highway and passes through Greenfield, Hagerman, and Lake Arthur, before ending back at US 285.

History

Prior to 1927, the Route 2 designation had been applied to a highway from the Texas state line near Carlsbad to Route 1 in Santa Fe. After 1927, State Road 2 ran from the Texas line southeast of Malaga to the Colorado border northeast of Chama. This newer routing replaced the original Route 8 between Santa Fe and Española and Route 36 from Española to Colorado. NM 2 was approximately 425 miles long. In the mid 1930s, it was decommissioned and replaced by US 285. In the early 1950s, US 285 was rerouted south of Roswell. NM 2 was recommissioned along the older routing. US 285 was rerouted again between Roswell and Artesia in the mid 1960s. The older routing was at first designated US 285 Alternate, but was renumbered as an extension of NM 2 by the 1970s. Part of the original US 285 re-alignment south of Roswell was cut off by the mid 1960s extension north of Artesia. This cutoff became a spur of NM 2. During the 1988 Renumbering, NM 2 was truncated. The route north of the spur was renumbered as NM 256 and mainline NM 2 was extended over the spur.

Major intersections

See also

References

External links

002
Transportation in Chaves County, New Mexico
Transportation in Eddy County, New Mexico